Iļģuciems is one of the older neighbourhoods situated in the Pārdaugava side of Riga.

References

Neighbourhoods in Riga